"Waze" is a song performed by British rappers Skepta, Chip and Young Adz. It was released as a single on 25 March 2020 through SKC M29 as the lead single from their collaborative studio album Insomnia. The song peaked at number 18 on the UK Singles Chart. The song was written by Joseph Adenuga, Jahmaal Fyffe, Adam Williams and produced by Cardo.

Music video
A music video to accompany the release of "Waze" was first released on YouTube on 25 March 2020.

Charts

Release history

References

2020 singles
Skepta songs
Chipmunk (rapper) songs
Songs written by Skepta
Songs written by Chip (rapper)